Grey Turner's sign refers to bruising of the flanks, the part of the body between the last rib and the top of the hip.  The bruising appears as a blue discoloration, and is a sign of retroperitoneal hemorrhage, or bleeding behind the peritoneum, which is a lining of the abdominal cavity.  Grey Turner's sign takes 24–48 hours to develop, and can predict a severe attack of acute pancreatitis.

Grey Turner's sign may be accompanied by Cullen's sign.  Both signs may be indicative of pancreatic necrosis with retroperitoneal or intra-abdominal bleeding.  Grey Turner's sign is named after British surgeon George Grey Turner.

Causes
Causes include 
 Acute pancreatitis, whereby methemalbumin formed from digested blood tracks subcutaneously around the abdomen from the inflamed pancreas.  
 Pancreatic hemorrhage
 Retroperitoneal hemorrhage
 Blunt abdominal trauma
 Ruptured / hemorrhagic ectopic pregnancy.
 Spontaneous bleeding secondary to coagulopathy (congenital or acquired)
 Aortic rupture, from ruptured abdominal aortic aneurysm or other causes.

History
It is named after British surgeon George Grey Turner.

References

External links 

Medical signs